Bahar (also Romanized as Bahār) is a city and capital of Bahar County, Hamadan Province, Iran. At the 2006 census, its population was 27,271, in 6,956 families.

References

Populated places in Bahar County
Cities in Hamadan Province